Varun Sharma (born 4 November 1987) is an Indian first-class cricketer who plays for Himachal Pradesh.

References

External links
 

1987 births
Living people
Indian cricketers
Himachal Pradesh cricketers
Cricketers from Himachal Pradesh